The Centre for Contemporary Arts (CCA) is an arts centre in Glasgow, Scotland. The year-round programme includes exhibitions, film, music, literature, festivals, spoken word, Gaelic and performances. The Centre commissions new work from artists it works with to present them.

The building 
CCA is situated on Sauchiehall Street and houses a number of cultural tenants, including Saramago Cafe Bar, independent shops Aye-Aye Books and Welcome Home, and also has a flat for visiting artists. CCA is housed in the Grecian Chambers, a category A listed building, designed by Alexander 'Greek' Thomson in 1867 to 1868 and substantially renovated for its present use by Page & Park in 1998. The building was previously home to the Third Eye Centre (1975–1991), founded as a multi-media arts centre by Tom McGrath in 1974.

The activities 
CCA operates an open source programming policy, where organizations and individuals are offered space in the building to programme their own events. In 2015 to 2016, CCA worked with 244 programme partners across 1,011 events and 28 festivals.

CCA curates six major exhibitions per year, presenting national and international contemporary artists in the gallery space. The building is also home to Intermedia Gallery, showcasing emerging artists. CCA offers a programme of artist residencies in the Creative Lab and internationally.

In 2015, CCA launched a public engagement programme which aims to extend access to CCA and has the prospect of cultural and social change explored through art. In 2015 to 2016, 60 activities took place in CCA and in communities throughout Glasgow.

CCA is home to a number of other cultural and artistic organizations. Cultural tenants include BHP Comics; Camcorder Guerillas; Cryptic; Document; Electron Club; MAP Magazine; LUX Scotland; Paragon; Playwrights’ Studio Scotland; Scottish Ensemble; Scottish Writers’ Centre; The List; Tom McGrath Writers' Room; University of the West of Scotland and Voice Business.

Supporters 
CCA is supported by Creative Scotland, Glasgow City Council, Glasgow Life, and the Esmee Fairbairn Foundation.

References

External links
Centre for Contemporary Arts
"Art and Soul of the Machine", The Scotsman
"Face to Face: Francis McKee, director of Centre for Contemporary Arts, Glasgow", The Herald
"Archive memories mark 40 years of Third Eye Centre", The Herald
"CCA at 40: a look back at the arts base that opened as the Third Eye Centre", Evening Times
"The Third Eye Centre evolves into the CCA", Evening Times
"CCA opens its doors to reach around the world", Evening Times
"CCA reaches out to the community", Evening Times

Art museums and galleries in Glasgow
Arts centres in Scotland
Category A listed buildings in Glasgow
Event venues established in 1992
Arts organisations based in Scotland
Contemporary art galleries in Scotland
1992 establishments in Scotland